The 1921 Erskine Seceders football team represented Erskine College in the 1921 college football season. The team was led by captain Dode Phillips.

Schedule

References

Erskine
Erskine Flying Fleet football seasons
Erskine Seceders football